Epicopeia mencia is a moth in the family Epicopeiidae. It was described by Frederic Moore in 1875. It is found in China, Vietnam, Korea, the Russian Far East, Japan and Taiwan.

The wingspan is about 60 mm. Adults can be distinguished from related species by two rows of red markings on the hindwings. There are two forms in both sexes, a typical form and a white-banded form (var. leucorrhea). The typical form is thought to mimic Byasa alcinous, while the latter form mimics Pachliopta aristolochiae.

The larvae feed on Ulmus species. There is one generation per year. The species overwinters in the pupal stage.

Gallery

References

Moths described in 1875
Epicopeiidae